Goral may refer to:

 Four species of Asian ungulates in the genus Naemorhedus
 Gorals, a people living in southern Poland, northern Slovakia and the Czech Republic

People with the last name Goral
Sigrid Goral (born 1952), German Olympic swimmer
Boleslaus Goral